The Gabrik River is a river in southern Iran that flows into the Gulf of Oman in Hormozgan.

References

Rivers of Hormozgan Province
Gulf of Oman